USS Cavallaro (DE-712/APD-128) was a  of the United States Navy.

Namesake
Salvatore John Cavallaro was born on 6 September 1920 in New York City. He enlisted in the United States Naval Reserve on 6 January 1942, and was commissioned Ensign on 28 January 1943. After training on landing craft, he joined the transport . In the Allied invasion of Sicily, he was assigned to guide the landing of the waves of assault boats, and with skill and courage, under repeated strafing and bombing attacks, carried on throughout the night and early daylight hours of 10 July 1943. Assigned similar duty in the invasion of Salerno Gulf on 9 September 1943, he was killed in action when his LCT was struck by shellfire. He was posthumously awarded the Navy Cross for his service at Sicily.

Construction and commissioning
She was launched on 15 June 1944, sponsored by Mrs. A. Cavallaro. A few weeks after launching, on 17 July 1944, it was decided that Cavallaro would be completed as a Crosley-class high speed transport, with the designation APD-128. She was commissioned on 13 March 1945.

Service history

1945–1946
Arriving for training at Pearl Harbor on 30 May 1945, Cavallaro sailed on 13 June for convoy escort duty out of Ulithi to the Philippines and Okinawa until 20 September, when she arrived at Sasebo, Japan.  She carried men between Japanese ports, and on 12 October departed Tokyo Bay bound for San Francisco, California.  After operating along the west coast, she was decommissioned and placed in reserve at San Diego, California, on 17 May 1946.

1953–1959
Cavallaro was recommissioned on 4 September 1953, and after intensive training, sailed for Japan on 12 March 1954.  She served as primary control ship in several large amphibious exercises during this tour of duty in the Far East, and transported Underwater Demolition Teams in day and night practice reconnaissance missions.  In the fall of 1954, she was stationed at Hai Phong and Saigon, Vietnam, as headquarters for those supervising the debarkation of refugees from Communist North Vietnam carried south by the U.S. Navy in "Operation Passage to Freedom".  She returned to San Diego on 23 November.

From March 1955, Cavallaro was homeported at Long Beach, California, conducting operations along the California coast and exercising with Marines.  Between 12 January 1956 and 4 October, she served again in the Far East, joining in a re-enactment of the assault on Iwo Jima made for training purposes, and visiting ports in Japan and the Philippines, as well as Hong Kong.  Her final cruise to the Orient, between 10 February 1959 and 23 May, found her exercising with both Korean and American Marines.  Cavallaro returned to Long Beach to prepare for transfer to the Republic of Korea, and was decommissioned and transferred 15 October 1959.

ROKS Kyung-Nam (APD-81) 
She served for forty years in the Republic of Korea Navy as ROKS Kyung-Nam (APD-81).  She was decommissioned on 29 December 2000, and sunk as a target in March or April 2003.

References

External links 
 

Crosley-class high speed transports
World War II amphibious warfare vessels of the United States
Cold War amphibious warfare vessels of the United States
Ships built in Bay City, Michigan
Ships transferred from the United States Navy to the Republic of Korea Navy
1944 ships